The Adventures of Captain Hasswell is a 1925 German silent adventure film directed by Rolf Randolf and starring Rudolf Hilberg, Ria Jende and Ernst Pittschau.

The film's sets were designed by the art director Gustav A. Knauer.

Cast
In alphabetical order
 Rudolf Hilberg as Jimmy Pitt, Weltenbummler
 Ria Jende as Baronin Mary
 Ernst Pittschau as von Berkhof
 Rolf Randolf as Kapitän Hasswell, Millionär
 Maria Zelenka as Gräfin Helga Scanzoni

References

Bibliography

External links

1925 films
Films of the Weimar Republic
Films directed by Rolf Randolf
German silent feature films
German black-and-white films
German adventure films
1925 adventure films
Silent adventure films
1920s German films
1920s German-language films